Stephen Lewis Stroughter (March 15, 1952 – March 6, 2018) was a major league baseball designated hitter/left fielder who played for the Seattle Mariners in 1982. He attended College of the Sequoias.

Career
Stroughter was originally drafted by the California Angels in the 15th round of the 1970 amateur draft, but he chose not to sign. He was drafted in the 1971 secondary phase amateur draft by the Chicago Cubs, but he again did not sign. He was the sixth overall pick in the 1971 secondary phase (active) amateur draft (drafted by the San Francisco Giants), and signed. On October 24, 1975, he was purchased by the Angels from the Giants. On April 5, 1979, he was released by the Angels and on June 5, 1979, he was signed by the Mariners. On December 19, 1980, he was traded to the Twins for Mike Bacsik. On May 28, 1981, he was purchased by the Mariners.

Stroughter spent over a decade in the minors before making his big league debut on April 7, at the age of 30. Pinch-hitting for Jim Essian, Stroughter grounded out in his first big league at-bat, which was against Doug Corbett of the Minnesota Twins.

A solid minor league player who hit for average and some power, Stroughter hit only .170 in 26 big league games (47 at-bats). Perhaps the best game of his career occurred on May 4. He went 2–4 with a home run off of Dennis Martínez.

He played his final big league game on July 24, 1982. Following his big league career, he returned to the minors and also played baseball in Japan, appearing in 28 games for the Hanshin Tigers in 1983.

Stroughter died March 6, 2018.

References

External links

Baseball Gauge
Japan Central League
Retrosheet
Venezuelan Professional Baseball League

1952 births
2018 deaths
African-American baseball players
Amarillo Giants players
American expatriate baseball players in Japan
American expatriate baseball players in Mexico
Baseball players from California
College of the Sequoias alumni
College of the Sequoias Giants baseball players
Decatur Commodores players
El Paso Diablos players
Fresno Giants players
Great Falls Giants players
Hanshin Tigers players
Leones del Caracas players
American expatriate baseball players in Venezuela
Major League Baseball designated hitters
Major League Baseball outfielders
Nippon Professional Baseball outfielders
Sportspeople from Visalia, California
Rieleros de Aguascalientes players
Salt Lake City Gulls players
Seattle Mariners players
Spokane Indians players
Syracuse Chiefs players
Toledo Mud Hens players
20th-century African-American sportspeople
21st-century African-American people